, known as Cyber Ninja in the United States, Warlord in Canada and Robo Ninja in the UK, is a 1988 Japanese science fiction action film directed by Keita Amemiya, which was co-produced and released by Namco that premiered on October 1988 at the Tokyo International Fantastic Film Festival. Two months later, it was released as a direct-to-video film on December 2, 1988. The film is based on the arcade game of the same name which was also developed and released by Namco.

Plot
In a future time a war is being waged between humans and cyborgs. One of the elite cyberninja of the enemy goes rogue and sets out to assist the royal family after their headstrong princess is captured and destined to become the final sacrifice needed to summon the cyborg legions digital overlord from another dimension. The resistance army sends a small band of soldiers in, among whom is a determined young man out to avenge the death of his brother at the hands of the robots. After suffering many losses and battling towards the enemy castle it is revealed that the cyberninja Shiranui is in fact the lost brother, transformed into the robot and now determined to regain his human body. The survivours must storm the technological castle and rescue the princess before the resistance army fires a super cannon to prevent the summoning of the electronic evil.

Cast 
Beverly Hills Video Group produced an English dubbed version of the film in 1994 directed by Carl Macek and distributed by Streamline Pictures for a 1995 release in North America.

Additional English Dub Voices 
 Richard Cansino - Clansman
 Carl Macek - Shogi Subordinate
 Don Pugsley - Clansman
 Barry Stigler - Clansman
 Daniel Woren - Clansman

Release
The film was originally screened in Japan back in October 1988 at the Tokyo International Fantastic Film Festival for a premiere release and later first released on VHS by Pony Canyon on December 2, 1988. Later it was released in North America Cyber Ninja for VHS on July 25, 1995 with an English dub, and on region 2 DVD in 2003 (Japan, Europe, Middle East, Greenland, and South Africa). The U.S. DVD was released in 2009.

Reception
The movie met with mixed reviews from Western film critics. It holds a 44% "Rotten" approval rating on Rotten Tomatoes.

Writing in the Montgomery Advertiser, Rick Harmon was highly critical of the film, saying it does not reach the level of Star Wars as promised by promotional materials. Specifically he criticized the special effects.

References

External links

1988 films
1980s science fiction action films
Japanese martial arts films
Japanese science fiction action films
1980s Japanese-language films
Ninja films
Martial arts science fiction films
Martial arts fantasy films
1988 martial arts films
Live-action films based on video games
Films set in castles
1980s Japanese films